The Glass House Mountains are a cluster of thirteen hills that rise abruptly from the coastal plain on the Sunshine Coast, Queensland, Australia. The highest hill is Mount Beerwah at 556 metres above sea level, but the most identifiable of all the hills is Mount Tibrogargan which from certain angles bears a resemblance to a face staring east towards the ocean. The Glass House Mountains are located near Beerburrum State Forest and Steve Irwin Way. From Brisbane, the mountains can be reached by following the Bruce Highway north and taking the Glass House Mountains tourist drive turn-off onto Steve Irwin Way. The trip is about one hour from Brisbane. The Volcanic peaks of the Glass House Mountains rise dramatically from the surrounding Sunshine Coast landscape. They were formed by intrusive plugs, remnants of volcanic activity that occurred 26–27 million years ago. Molten rock filled small vents or intruded as bodies beneath the surface and solidified into land rocks. Millions of years of erosion have removed the surrounding exteriors of volcanic cores and softer sandstone rock.

While the traditional names for the hills themselves are very old, the term 'Glass House Mountains' was given more recently by explorer Lieutenant James Cook on 17 May 1770.  The peaks reminded him of the glass furnaces in his home county of Yorkshire. Matthew Flinders explored the area and climbed Mount Beerburrum after sailing along Pumicestone Passage in 1799.  The Glass House Mountains National Landscape was added to the Australian National Heritage List on 3 August 2006. In the land between the peaks, pineapple and poultry farming, as well as commercial forestry and quarrying are the main land uses.

In 2009 as part of the Q150 celebrations, the Glass House Mountains was announced as one of the Q150 Icons of Queensland for its role as a "Natural attraction".

Geology
The range was formed as molten lava cooled to form hard rock in the cores of volcanoes 26–27 million years ago.  The source of the lava was from the East Australia hotspot. The cores of the hills contain columns of comendite from lava which cools quickly into a hard rock.  The surrounding softer rocks have been eroded in the subsequent time, forming the spectacular volcanic plugs that remain today. The peaks' location relative to each other exhibits an alignment that is believed to have occurred due to fracturing.  Mt Ngungun consists of subvolcanic rock, also known as a hypabyssal rock, an intrusive rock emplaced at medium-to-shallow depths within the crust and has intermediate grain size, and often porphyritic texture between that of volcanic and plutonic rocks.

Peaks

Each of the peaks is protected within the Glass House Mountains National Park. Some of the peaks display vertical columns, particularly Mount Coonowrin, Mount Ngungun and Mount Beerwah at the Organ Pipes. These columns are the result of lava contraction. Scattered throughout the hills are shallow caves which have been formed by wind erosion on rocks that were softened by groundwater. The peaks are culturally significant to the traditional owners, the Gubbi Gubbi people. Under a native title claim, access to the peaks could be restricted as they are considered spiritual places. To the south east of the Glass House Mountains township is an Aboriginal bora ring.  The names of each mountain in the range are:

 Mount Beerburrum, 278 m
 Mount Beerwah, 556 m
 Mount Coochin or The Coochin Hills, 235 m and 230 m
 Mount Coonowrin or Crookneck or Fakebig, 377 m
 Mount Elimbah or The Saddleback, 109 m
 Mount Ngungun, Mount Ngun Ngun said as Gun Gun 253 m
 Mount Tibberoowuccum, 220 m
 Mount Tibrogargan and Cooee, 364 m and 177 m
 Mount Tunbubudla or the Twins, 338 m and 294 m
 Wild Horse Mountain, 123 m
 Mount Miketeebumulgrai: 199 m
 Mount Ninderry 306 m
 Mount Coolum 208 m

Aboriginal cultural knowledge
The Glass House Mountains are located in the traditional lands of the Jinibara and Gubbi Gubbi people. First Nations Australians have an elaborate legend about the mountains.

Public access 
The mountains are managed by Queensland National Parks and are promoted as a tourist asset.  Historically bushwalking and climbing has been undertaken for more than a century.  However the two largest mountains have been closed by National Parks in recent years.  Firstly, Coonowrin was closed in 1999 as a result of a geological report and the development of an adjacent rock quarry.  Secondly, the walking track used to access Mt Beerwah was closed in 2009 as the result of a rock collapse from the caves area across the main tourist track and was reopened January 2016.  Tibrogargan and Ngungun are open to the public for bushwalking and climbing.

The Beerwah and Tibrogargan mountains are culturally significant and hold "sacred values" to the local Jinibara and Kabi Kabi people who request visitors do not climb the mountains.

Flora and fauna
There are many different types of plants including trees, grass, bushes and the occasional shrub. Animals that live there include birds, reptiles, frogs, bats, rats, cats and mammals. The Elf Skink, a small lizard, also populates the area.

See also

 List of mountains in Australia

References

External links

 Photos of Mount Beerwah, Glass House Mountains

 
Australian National Heritage List